Zebra is an album by Jack DeJohnette featuring trumpeter Lester Bowie recorded in 1985 for the video program titled "Tadayuki Naito/Zebra" and released on the MCA label in 1989. The Allmusic review by Scott Yanow states, "The performances are moody and has its colorful moments... Superior background music, recommended mostly to Jack DeJohnette completists". The Penguin Guide to Jazz wrote that it was "Not really a jazz album at all, but well worth having for some striking atmospheric music."

Track listing

Recorded at Grog Kill Studio, Woodstock, NY on May 8–10, 1985

Personnel 
 Jack DeJohnette – synthesizer
 Lester Bowie – trumpet (tracks 1, 3 & 5)

References 

Jack DeJohnette albums
Lester Bowie albums
1989 soundtrack albums
Film soundtracks
MCA Records soundtracks